The Bullrun Rally is an infamous and underground annual automobile rally of over 100, mainly exotic vehicles, with drivers from all around the world. Cars are typically highly modified exotics or restored classics and compete over seven days, traversing 3,000 to 4,000 miles. The Bullrun route changes each year but always takes place in North America.

Founders
The Bullrun rally and brand creators are former Investment Banker, Andy Duncan, and his cousin David Green - both originally from the United Kingdom. They were originally involved with the Gumball 3000 car rally in Europe and moved to the US to set up the Bullrun rally as a USA based annual event. They created a successful spin off TV show based on the rally and were executive producers of both the Bullrun Reality Show and the documentary version of the rally Cops, Cars and Superstars that has been shown on TV networks in 80 countries around the world. They also produced Inside West Coast Customs and Andy Duncan has produced multiple TV shows for Discovery Channel since 2015. David Green currently hosts ITV coverage of Glorious Goodwood in the UK.

History

The Bullrun rally first started in June 2004 and ran from Hollywood, CA to Miami, Fla. This first event attracted multiple celebrities, 100 plus super cars from all over the world and global media attention. Drivers enter the rally by invite only with entry fees being as much as $20,000 per car depending on the rally event. After the success of the first rally its momentum built up to the point in 2007 when the rally owners created and produced on Spike TV a spin-off TV series Bullrun Reality Show based on the live rally event. 

Subsequent seasons of the spin off reality TV show version of the rally were produced for Speed Channel. On the formatted reality show version of the rally on Spike TV, speeders were disqualified unlike the live rally events.

Arrests
Penalties for speeding on the rally are legendary with traffic ticket fines reaching up to $10,000 for individual offences. Arrests were common occurrences amongst the drivers, on average a driver went to jail every day of each event. The rally often became a cat and mouse game each year between the drivers trying to evade detection and the police trying to 'catch a Bullrunner'. The police across the USA have implemented road blocks, issued APBs for the rally owners, used helicopters and arrested drivers en masse in an attempt to stop the rally.

Rallies
2014: New York to Scottsdale
2013: Montreal to New Orleans, 10 Year Anniversary
2012: Los Angeles to Los Angeles
2011: Las Vegas to Miami.
2010: New York City to Las Vegas.
2009: NY to Austin Tx.
2008: Calgary to Scottsdale.
2007: Montreal to Key West.
2006: New York to Los Angeles.
2005: Los Angeles to Los Angeles.
2004: London to Ibiza - special edition.
2004: Los Angeles to Miami.

Celebrities
Over the last several years many celebrities have participated in Bullrun events and attended Bullrun rally parties, including Paris Hilton, Ryan Dunn, Dennis Rodman, Mario Andretti, Ice-T & Coco, Kim Kardashian, The Dudesons, George Saint Pierre, Hayden Christensen, Rampage Jackson, The Cuban Brothers, Richard Rawlings, Aaron Kaufman, Stefan Johansson, Urijah Faber, Boyd Coddington, George Barros, Jason Statham, Michelle Rodriguez, Gerard Butler, Rupert Grint, Josh Harnett, Joe Francis, Bill Mahr and Carl Lewis. It has become a hallmark of the Bullrun events to have celebrities on hand each year and often driving their own personal exotic cars.

In the media
Bullrun drivers have achieved national coverage by participating in the Bullrun live rally. Many original members of Bullrun have gone on to TV shows and or national notoriety, including Richard Rawlings and Aaron Kaufman from Fast N' Loud on Discovery Channel, Bill Wu from the Bullrun Reality TV Show and One Car Too Far also on Discovery Channel. Bullrunner Ed Bolian is also a former NY to Los Angeles Cannonball driving record holder. Previous Bullrunners Richard Rawlings and Dennis Collins were prior holders of the Cannonball Record having split from the start of a Bullrun rally that started in New York in 2006 to take on the record. They had had a $50,000 bet the night before a bullrun party they could not break the record. Bullrunner Alex Roy, author of The Driver, also held the Cannonball Record and had a much publicized dispute with Richard Rawlings over who the real record holder was.

Awards
The Bullrun Navigator Award is given to the team that has the best overall navigation for the Rally's entire seven days. Other awards include The Spirit of Bullrun Award and Bullrun Order of Merit.

Winners, Navigator Award

2014       Billy Blatty (solo) - Team Big Easy Bandit / Chevrolet Camaro SS
2013       Billy Blatty & Ricky Chancey - Team Big Easy Bandits / Mercedes ML 63
2012	Seth Rose & Tony King - Team Hudson Jeans / Exotics Rally / Nissan GT-R	
2011	Seth Rose & Tony King - Team Hudson Jeans / Exotics Rally / Nissan GT-R	
2010	Ricky Chancey & Dudley Geigerman - Team LuckynutZ / BMW M6 	
2009	Dennis Collins	& Richard Rawlings - Team Gas Monkey / Ferrari 550
2008	Adam Levinson & Wije - Team Fortress / Audi R8
2007	Claus Ettensberger & Joaquin Mejia - Team CEC / Porsche Techart Cayenne Turbo	
2006	Tove Christensen and Peter Michels - Team Forest Park Pictures / Porsche 911		
2005	Marek Harrison	& Nigel Lord - Team Britania / Aston Martin DB9
2004	Richard & Sue Rawlings - Team Gas Monkey / Chevrolet Avalanche

See also 
 Automobiles
 BMW M
 Ferrari
 Koenigsegg
 Lamborghini
 List of SuperCars (top speed 240 mph or faster)
 McLaren Automotive
 Mercedes-AMG
 Porsche
 Sports car
 Sports sedan
 Supercar

References 

Bullrun 2011
Bullrun 2011 winners
Team Hall N Nass
SNTL Car Life
Bullrun sponsor | Vivid Racing press release
Interview with Bullrun founder Andy Duncan
Crash in Fla. during Bullrun 2011
5 car crash during Bullrun 2011
Ice-T's Mercedes-AMG SL55-R

External links

Bullrun on facebook
Bullrun website
 Team Exotics Rally

Road rallying